"Rock Like War" is a song by Rustic Overtones that appears on the band's 2007 studio album Light at the End.

History
"Rock Like War" was first premiered by the band on July 26, 1998 at a performance at the State Theater in Portland, Maine, along with a half-dozen other new songs. The song entered the band's normal rotation of live songs that appeared on their set lists, although they left the song off both 1998's Rooms by the Hour and 2001's Viva Nueva! When the band broke up in 2002, the song still remained unrecorded and was circulated only by fans who had access to live versions of the song. During the band's 2007 reunion, the Rustic Overtones recorded the song along with six other older unrecorded songs to appear on their new album, Light at the End. The song received its first radio airtime on Portland, Maine's alternative station WCYY in June, 2007 after the premier of new song "Troublesome," (also on the album) and the announcement of the band's appearance at a live WCYY patio show in July. It was at this show where the song was premiered live for the first time in its new post-breakup form as the show's closing song. In live shows after the patio show, the song has often been used as the final song before the encore set.

Reception and legacy
The new version of Rock Like War was immediately well received by the band's fans. After the song's premiere, it held the number one spot on WCYY's "top five at five" for many weeks, and is still found in the station's regular song rotation today.

References

2007 songs